Ricks may refer to:

People
 Andre Ricks (born 1996), American basketball player
 Bob Ricks (21st century), American police chief
 Christopher Ricks (born 1933), British literary critic and scholar
 Doug Ricks, American politician and member of the Idaho Senate 
 Earl T. Ricks (1908–1954), United States Air Force general
 Eli Ricks (born 2001), American football player
 James B. Ricks (1852–1906), American jurist
 James “Pappy” Ricks (1927–2011), American basketball player
 Jerry Ricks (1940–2007), American blues guitarist
 Jim Ricks (born 1973), American and Irish visual artist
 Jimmy "Ricky" Ricks (1924–1974), founding member of the R&B group The Ravens
 Joel Ricks (1804–1888), Mormon pioneer 
 Kevin Ricks (born 1960), convicted sexual predator
 Lawrence Ricks (born 1961), American football professional running back
 Mark Ricks (1924–2016), American politician
 Mark Ricks (gridiron football) (born 1970), American player of gridiron football
 Martha Ann Erskine Ricks (1817–1901), Liberian quilter
 Melissa Ricks (born 1990), Filipina actress
 Mikhael Ricks (born 1974), former National Football League tight end
 Naquetta Ricks, Liberian-American member of the Colorado House of Representatives 
 Robert Ricks, American meteorologist at the National Weather Service
 Stephen D. Ricks, professor at Brigham Young University 
 Thomas E. Ricks (journalist) (born 1955), American journalist
 Thomas E. Ricks (Mormon) (1828–1901), Mormon pioneer and community leader
 Tijuana Ricks (born 1978), American television actress

Places
 Rick's Café Casablanca, a restaurant, bar and café in Casablanca, Morocco
 Ricks College, Rexburg, Idaho, now Brigham Young University–Idaho
 Ricks Spring, a Karst spring in Utah, USA
 Ricks Township, Christian County, Illinois, United States

Other
 Porter Ricks, a fictional Park ranger from the TV show Flipper
 Rick's Café Américain, a fictional bar which is the principal set of the film Casablanca

See also
 
 Rick (disambiguation)
 Rix (disambiguation)

Surnames from given names